Avilash Paul (born 26 December 1994) is an Indian professional footballer who plays as a goalkeeper for ATK Mohun Bagan.

Career

Paul began his career in Pune FC's Academy. A year later, he joined Second Division League side Gangtok Himalayan SC before joining Kolkata giants East Bengal. He then joined Kenkre FC on Loan from East Bengal to play in the I-League Second Division in 2017 final round.

Aizawl FC

At the start of the 2017–2018 season he was picked up by Aizawl FC after Albino had left to join Delhi Dynamos, He Proved out to be an Outstanding Goalkeeper for the team appearing 21 times across I-League, AFC Champions League, AFC Cup in 2017–18.

ATK
After having a successful season with Aizawl FC he joined ATK for season 2018-2019 and become 3rd choice keeper behind Arindam and Debjit.

References

1994 births
Indian footballers
Aizawl FC players
Living people
Pune FC players
East Bengal Club players
Association football goalkeepers
I-League players
Indian Super League players
ATK (football club) players
ATK Mohun Bagan FC players
Footballers from West Bengal